Daniel Lacroix (born March 11, 1969) is a Canadian former professional ice hockey player and coach. He played in the National Hockey League with five teams between 1993 and 2000. The rest of his career, which  lasted from 1989 to 2002, was spent in various minor leagues. After retiring as a player he became a coach, working for many teams.

In December 2019, he was named the head coach of the Moncton Wildcats in the Quebec Major Junior Hockey League. He was an assistant coach for the Montreal Canadiens until April 27, 2018, to become head coach of the Lithuanian national team. Lacroix was drafted by the New York Rangers in the second round, 33rd overall, of the 1989 NHL Entry Draft. A seven-year NHL veteran left wing, Lacroix played for the New York Rangers, Boston Bruins, Philadelphia Flyers, Edmonton Oilers, and the New York Islanders.

Career
Born in Montreal, Quebec, Lacroix appeared in a total of 188 NHL games for the New York Rangers, Boston Bruins, Philadelphia Flyers, Edmonton Oilers and the New York Islanders recording 11 goals and seven assists for 18 points and 379 penalty minutes. Aside from the playing in the NHL, Lacroix also spent eight seasons in the American Hockey League (AHL), three seasons in the International Hockey League (IHL) and four seasons in the Quebec Major Junior Hockey League (QMJHL). In 2000, he won the Turner Cup championship with the Chicago Wolves.

Coaching career
From 2002 to 2006, Lacroix was an assistant coach of the Moncton Wildcats. During his stint with the team, the Wildcats reached the QMJHL finals twice, including a Memorial Cup appearance in 2006. Halfway through the 2004–05 season, Lacroix took over as Moncton's interim head coach for the second half of the season. From 2006 to 2009, he served as assistant coach for the New York Islanders. On August 5, 2009, Lacroix was named an assistant coach for the Hamilton Bulldogs for the 2009–10 AHL season. When Guy Boucher was hired as coach of the Tampa Bay Lightning, Lacroix followed Boucher to Tampa Bay. From the 2013–14 season he was an assistant coach of the New York Rangers.

Lacroix was hired by the Montreal Canadiens on July 30, 2014, as an assistant coach and served in the role until 2018.

On October 18, 2018, Lithuanian Ice Hockey Federation appointed Lacroix as head coach of men's national team on one-year contract.

On January 21, 2019, Kölner Haie from the Deutsche Eishockey Liga (DEL) announced Lacroix to be their head coach for the rest of the season after the firing of Peter Draisaitl.

Career statistics

Regular season and playoffs

References

External links
 

1969 births
Living people
Atlantic City Boardwalk Bullies players
Binghamton Rangers players
Boston Bruins players
Canadian ice hockey coaches
Canadian ice hockey left wingers
Chicago Wolves (IHL) players
Edmonton Oilers players
Hamilton Bulldogs (AHL) players
Ice hockey people from Montreal
Ligue Nord-Américaine de Hockey players
Lithuania men's national ice hockey team coaches
Moncton Wildcats coaches
Montreal Canadiens coaches
Newcastle Jesters players
New York Islanders coaches
New York Islanders players
New York Rangers draft picks
New York Rangers coaches
New York Rangers players
Philadelphia Flyers players
Providence Bruins players
Rochester Americans players
Tampa Bay Lightning coaches